Hertha Guthmar (born 1908) was a German film actress of the 1930s.

Selected filmography
 Roses Bloom on the Moorland (1929)
 Ariane (1931)
 The Mad Bomberg (1932)
 Ways to a Good Marriage (1933)
 A Woman with Power of Attorney (1934)
 The Hour of Temptation (1936)

References

Bibliography 
 Lotte H. Eisner. The Haunted Screen: Expressionism in the German Cinema and the Influence of Max Reinhardt. University of California Press, 2008.

External links 
 

1908 births
Year of death unknown
German film actresses
German stage actresses